James Carmichael Smith (1852 - after 1914) was a postmaster in the Bahamas and Sierra Leone, a member of the
Nassau Legislative Council and in 1887 founded the newspaper Freeman. He was a Market Socialist and Egalitarian who published numerous books and writings promoting these views during the late 19th and early 20th centuries. He was a Pan Africanist and a strong defender of Black people, made evident in the lengthy exchange he had with the Englishman John Gardiner in 1886 after the latter referred to Black Bahamians as "Lazy and good for nothing". He also supported Caribbean integration, promoting the idea of federating the West Indies and charting their own path to prosperity. He was a strong supporter of the Empire but believed in the Self Governance of the British West Indies as a federal province within the Empire.

Early life and family
James Carmichael Smith was born in the Bahamas in 1852, the son of an Englishman from Yorkshire and a black Bahamian mother. He was named after the governor of the Bahamas, James Carmichael Smyth.

Career
Smith was postmaster in the Bahamas and Sierra Leone, a member of the Nassau Legislative Council and in 1887 founded the newspaper Freeman.

James Carmichael Smith was among the earliest Bahamians to express Pan African views. In a speech, he gave on 1 August 1887, he focused on the importance of Africa as a central point in which all Black people should unify in the cause of its development: "let us endeavour to become more and more united, and let the children of Africa throughout the Western Hemisphere remember Fatherland or Motherland, let them remember Africa". Continuing this idea he said: "Let us use Africa as the unifying point, and attempt to organize the League of Africa, which should aim to include every human being having a drop of African blood in his veins of which he is not ashamed". He continues: "a league which, after inheriting the blessings of the latest civilization, would undertake the task of carrying or sending those blessings to the people of Africa by the hands of her own children; which would endeavour to teach the unenlightened people of Africa all the arts and manners of civilization, and so fit them to become citizens of free and independent nationalities. This is the special, the high duty of the enlightened children of Africa."

Smith was among the earliest in the Caribbean to express Afro-Caribbean leftism. In 1892 he published The Distribution Of The Produce. A book that criticized the wage competitive system and promoted a wage co-operative system through profit-sharing. He believed the former gave power to one class of people over the other and argued that civilization should be moving in the direction of equality. He published more works in the early 1900s promoting Market Socialism: "Money and profit-sharing; or, The double standard money system" in 1908 and "Abundance and hard times" in 1908, just to name a few. His views were Egalitarian and predate similar views held by the Trinidadian, C. L. R. James.

Later life
Smith retired to Jersey from Sierra Leone in 1914. He subsequently moved to London, married, and had a daughter.

Selected publications
 Economic Reconstruction. A paper read at the Royal Colonial Institute on 15th June, 1916. P. S. King & Son, London, 1918.

References

External links 
http://www.bahamasnationalarchives.bs/assets/smyth.pdf
http://www.jeffreygreen.co.uk/153-james-carmichael-smith-civil-servant-and-author-1952-1919?LMCL=I4LLmq

1852 births
20th-century deaths
Year of death unknown
Postmasters
Bahamian politicians